Anders Ward Nielsen (24 February 1967 – 29 July 2010) was a badminton player who competed for England.

Badminton career
Nielsen represented Great Britain in the 1992 Summer Olympics in Barcelona.

He represented England and won a gold medal in the mixed team and a bronze medal in the men's singles event, at the 1994 Commonwealth Games in Victoria, British Columbia, Canada.

He represented England 40 times between 1987 and 1996 and won bronze in the 1992 and 1994 European Badminton Championships. He was twice the English National champion in 1992 and 1995.  He died of cancer in 2010.

Family
His mother was Heather Ward.

References

External links
 
 
 
 
 

1967 births
2010 deaths
English male badminton players
Olympic badminton players of Great Britain
Badminton players at the 1992 Summer Olympics
Commonwealth Games medallists in badminton
Commonwealth Games gold medallists for England
Commonwealth Games bronze medallists for England
Badminton players at the 1994 Commonwealth Games
Medallists at the 1994 Commonwealth Games